Burroughs is a surname of French origin. At the time of the British Census of 1881, its relative frequency was highest in Suffolk (8.9 times the British average), followed by Norfolk, Gloucestershire, Shropshire, Huntingdonshire, Somerset, Hampshire, Surrey, Lincolnshire, and Orkney.

Notable people sharing the surname "Burroughs" 

Alvin Burroughs (1911–1950), American musician
Augusten Burroughs (b. 1965), American writer
Bryson Burroughs (1869–1934), American artist
Charles Burroughs (1876–1902), American track and field athlete and Olympian
Derrick Burroughs (b. 1962), American football player and coach
Diane Burroughs (b. 1960), American television writer
Dillon Burroughs (b. 1976), American writer
Don Burroughs (1931–2006), American football player
Edgar Rice Burroughs (1875–1950), American author, creator of the John Carter of Mars series and the Tarzan series
Edith Burroughs (b. 1939), American professional bowler
Edith Woodman Burroughs (1871–1916), American sculptor
Edward Burroughs (bishop) (1885–1934), English Anglican priest
 Ellen Burroughs, better known as Sophie Jewett (1861–1909), American poet and professor
Elzy Burroughs (1771/1777–1825), American stonemason, engineer, lighthouse builder, and lighthouse keeper
Franklin Burroughs (businessman) (1834–1897), American entrepreneur
Franklin Burroughs (author) (b. ?), American author
George Burroughs (1650–1692), American Congregational pastor
Harmon P. Burroughs (1846–1907), American farmer and politician
Henry Burroughs (1845–1878), American professional baseball player
Jackie Burroughs (b. 1939), Canadian actress
Jeff Burroughs (b. 1951), American baseball player
Jeremiah Burroughs (c. 1600–1646), also written "Jeremiah Burroughes", English Congregationalist and Puritan preacher
Jerrold Burroughs (b. 1967), American politician
John Burroughs (1837–1921), American naturalist and essayist
John Burroughs (governor) (1907–1978), American businessman and politician
Sir John Burroughs (fl. 17th century), English soldier and military commander
John A. Burroughs Jr. (b. 1936), American government official
John Coleman Burroughs (1913–1979), American illustrator
John H. Burroughs (?–?), American and Confederate naval engineer and shipwright
John J. Burroughs (1798–1872), American lawyer and circuit court clerk
Jordan Burroughs, (b. 1988), American wrestler
Joseph Burroughs (1685–1761), English Baptist minister
Kyle Burroughs (b. 1995), Canadian professional ice hockey player
Lane Burroughs, American college baseball coach
Nannie Helen Burroughs (1879–1961), American educator, orator, religious leader, and businesswoman
Robert P. Burroughs (?–1994), American businessman, political advisor, and statesman
Sammie Burroughs (born 1973), American football player
Sean Burroughs (b. 1980), American baseball player
Sherman E. Burroughs (1903–1992), American naval rear-admiral
Sherman Everett Burroughs (1870–1923), American politician
Silas Mainville Burroughs (disambiguation), more than one person with the name
Stanley Burroughs (1903–1991), American dietary theorist and author
Theresa Burroughs (1929–2019), American civil rights activist
Tim Burroughs (b. ?), American basketball player
Tom Burroughs (b. ?), American politician
Wilbur Burroughs (1884–1960), American track and field athlete and Olympian
William Burroughs, more than one person with the name
William Seward Burroughs I (1855–1898), American inventor
William S. Burroughs (1914–1997), American author and grandson of William Seward Burroughs
William S. Burroughs Jr. (1947–1981), also known as William S. Burroughs III, an American author, son of William S. Burroughs, and great-grandson of William Seward Burroughs
Williana Burroughs (1882–1945), American teacher, communist political activist, and politician
Margaret Taylor-Burroughs (1917–2010), American artist and writer
Frederick Traill-Burroughs (1831–1905), British military officer

Fictional characters sharing the surname "Burroughs" 

 Hilda Burroughs, a character in Robert A. Heinlein's novel The Number of the Beast
 Lord Burroughs, a character in the video game Clock Tower 3
 Maggie Burroughs, a character in the Nightmare on Elm Street series; see List of characters in the Nightmare on Elm Street series

See also 
 Burrough, includes a list of people with surname Burrough
 Burrowes (surname)
 Burrows (surname)
 Burrow (surname)

References